The William F. Sharpe Award for Scholarship in Financial Research is an award given each year to the author of the research article published in the Journal of Financial and Quantitative Analysis (JFQA) which has made the most important contribution to financial economics. The award is dedicated to William F. Sharpe, a financial economist at Stanford University and winner of the 1990 Nobel Memorial Prize in Economic Sciences, and was established 1999. It is affirmed with a $5000 reward financed donated by the Litzenberger Family Foundation, Weyerhaeuser Company Foundation, William Alberts, Norman Metcalfe, and the University of Washington School of Business Administration, among others. Nominees for the William F. Sharpe Award are voted for by JFQA readers and the journal's associate editors, and the managing editors of the journal select a winner among the nominees.

List of William F. Sharpe Award winners

The following table displays a list of the winners of the William F. Sharpe Award along with information on the article for which it was received.

See also

 List of economics awards

Notes & References

Economics awards